The St. Rose of Lima Cathedral  also called Carúpano Cathedral, is a Catholic cathedral protected as a historical monument located in the city of Carúpano, in the Paria Peninsula, Sucre State, in the South American country of Venezuela. The cathedral follows the Roman or Latin rite and serves as the seat of the Catholic Diocese of Carúpano.

It was built under invocation of Santa Rosa de Lima and belongs to the set of monuments Bermúdez Municipality since 1996 under Decree 8377 of 2 October of that year; in the category of "Historic Monument". The original cathedral was founded in 1742. The current church was built in the late fifties inspired by a mixed Romanesque style, replacing a smaller building. It has two towers, three ships and cruise, two domes and an apse. The last major change to the building was in 1959. It is consecrated in 1969 and declared a heritage site at the municipal level in 1996.

See also
List of cathedrals in Venezuela
Roman Catholicism in Venezuela
St. Rose of Lima Church

References

Roman Catholic cathedrals in Venezuela
Carúpano
Roman Catholic churches completed in 1742
1742 establishments in the Spanish Empire
18th-century Roman Catholic church buildings in Venezuela